tbjhome is China's only English-language magazine covering lifestyle, design and architecture.

References

2006 establishments in China
Architecture magazines
Art magazines published in China
Design magazines
Lifestyle magazines
Magazines established in 2006
Magazines published in Beijing